This list of Ramsar sites in the United States  are those wetlands that are considered to be of international importance under the Ramsar Convention. For a full list of all Ramsar sites worldwide, see List of Ramsar wetlands of international importance.

List of Ramsar sites

See also
 Ramsar Convention
 List of Ramsar sites worldwide

References

External links

 
Ramsar
United States
Ramsar